Halyna Hai (Гали́на Семе́нівна Гай; 3 December 1956 – 28 March 2021) was a Ukrainian poet and writer. She studied at the Institute of Journalism at Taras Shevchenko National University of Kyiv and graduated in 1982.

Hai worked both as a journalist for the Ukrainian state media and was the long-time editor of the publishing house Bukva based in Bila Tserkva.

Hai died on 28 March 2021, aged 64, from COVID-19.

References

20th-century Ukrainian writers
20th-century Ukrainian poets
Ukrainian women writers
Ukrainian women poets
1956 births
2021 deaths
Deaths from the COVID-19 pandemic in Ukraine
People from Cherkasy Oblast
Place of death missing
Taras Shevchenko National University of Kyiv alumni
Recipients of the Order of Merit (Ukraine), 3rd class